Rachi is a village of the Katerini municipality. Before the 2011 local government reform it was part of the municipality of Petra. The 2011 census recorded 423 inhabitants in the village. Rachi is a part of the community of Lofos.

See also
 List of settlements in the Pieria regional unit

References

Populated places in Pieria (regional unit)